Geoffrey Galt Harpham (born 1946) is an American academic who until recently served as president and director of the National Humanities Center. One of the characteristics of his tenure was the encouragement of dialogue between the humanities on the one hand and the natural and social sciences on the other. He is a senior fellow at the Kenan Institute for Ethics at Duke University and also a Life Member of Clare Hall at the University of Cambridge. He is in addition a member of the board of visitors of Ralston College.

His book, The Humanities and the Dream of America, was published by the University of Chicago Press in March 2011.

Bibliography

Books
 On the Grotesque: Strategies of Contradiction in Art and Literature (Princeton University Press, 1982; paperback, 1986). 2nd ed. with new preface (Davies Publishing, 2006). This work was the primary inspiration for “Domus Aurea,” a composition by Edmund Campion for piano and vibraphone, which premiered at the Centre Pompidou, Paris, November 4, 2000.
 The Ascetic Imperative in Culture and Criticism (University of Chicago Press, 1987; paperback, 1992).
 Getting It Right: Language, Literature, and Ethics (University of Chicago Press, 1992). Partially translated into Croatian as Pripovjedni Imperative, in Politika ietika pripovijedanja, ed. Vladimir Biti (Zagreb: Hrvatska sveucilišna naklada, 2003), 129–56.
 One of Us: The Mastery of Joseph Conrad (University of Chicago Press, 1996).
 Shadows of Ethics: Criticism and the Just Society (Duke University Press, 1999).
 Language Alone: The Critical Fetish of Modernity (Routledge Press, 2002).
 A Glossary of Literary Terms, 8th ed., coauthored with M.H. Abrams (Wadsworth, 2005); 9th ed. (Wadsworth, 2008). Translated into Persian, Turkish, Chinese, Korean, Greek. Indian edition, 2009.
 The Character of Criticism (Routledge Press, 2006).
 On Being Human, special issue of Daedalus, 138.3 (2009), consulting editor. This issue grew out of the “Autonomy, Singularity, Creativity: The Human and the Humanities” initiative sponsored by the National Humanities Center, 2006–09.
The Humanities and the Dream of America (University of Chicago Press, 2011).

Critical studies and reviews of Harpham's work
 Review of What do you think, Mr. Ramirez?.

References

External links 
 The National Humanities Center
 Recent Publications of Geoffrey Harpham
 Curriculum Vitae of Geoffrey Galt Harpham

1946 births
Living people
American humanities academics
Northwestern University alumni
University of California, Los Angeles alumni